Thomas Adler (born 23 January 1965) is a former German footballer.

Adler made 19 appearances in the Bundesliga during his playing career.

References

External links 
 

1965 births
Living people
German footballers
Association football forwards
Bundesliga players
2. Bundesliga players
SpVgg Greuther Fürth players
KFC Uerdingen 05 players
Fortuna Düsseldorf players
Tennis Borussia Berlin players
German football managers
Sportspeople from Fürth
Footballers from Bavaria
West German footballers